Washington Townsend (January 20, 1813 – March 18, 1894) was a Republican member of the U.S. House of Representatives from Pennsylvania.

Early life and career
Washington Townsend was born in West Chester, Pennsylvania. His father was botanist David Townsend, co-founder and chief cashier of the Bank of Chester County. He attended a private school and West Chester Academy. He was engaged as a bank teller from 1828 to 1844. He studied law, was admitted to the bar in 1844 and commenced practice in West Chester.

He was prosecuting attorney of Chester County, Pennsylvania, in 1848. He served as deputy attorney under Attorneys General James Cooper and Cornelius Darragh. He was cashier of the Bank of Chester County from 1849 to 1857. He was a delegate to the Whig National Convention in 1852, and a delegate to the 1860 Republican National Convention.

He was elected as a member to the American Philosophical Society in 1882.

Congress
Townsend was elected as a Republican to the Forty-first and to the three succeeding Congresses. He served as chairman of the United States House Committee on Public Lands during the Forty-third Congress. He was not a candidate for renomination in 1876. He again resumed the practice of his profession in West Chester, and served as president of the Bank of Chester County from 1879 to 1894.

Death
He died in West Chester in 1894. Interment was in Oaklands Cemetery, near West Chester.

References

Washington Townsend at The Political Graveyard

External links

1813 births
1894 deaths
Burials at Oaklands Cemetery
Pennsylvania lawyers
County district attorneys in Pennsylvania
People from West Chester, Pennsylvania
Republican Party members of the United States House of Representatives from Pennsylvania
19th-century American politicians
Members of the American Philosophical Society
19th-century American lawyers